Rothilde (Latin: Rothildis; 871 – 928/929) was a lady born into the royal family of Western Francia.

Biography 
Rothilde was a daughter of the King of the Franks, Charles the Bald, son of Louis the Pious. Her mother was Charles’ second spouse, Queen Richilde of Provence, sister of King Boso of Provence.

In ca. 890, Rothilde married Roger, Count of Maine. Their eldest child was Hugh I, Count of Maine. Their second child was a daughter, Judith, who married Hugh the Great, duke of the Franks and count of Paris.

References

Frankish princesses
9th-century French people
9th-century French women
10th-century French people
10th-century French women
Countesses of Maine
Daughters of emperors
Daughters of kings